Saptha exanthista is a species of moth of the family Choreutidae. It is found in the rainforests of north-eastern Queensland as well as New Guinea and Indonesia.

Adults have dark brown wings, with white patches on the forewings and an orange patch on each hindwing.

References

External links

Australian Faunal Directory
Image at choreutidae.lifedesks.org

Choreutidae
Moths of Australia
Moths of Indonesia
Moths of New Guinea
Moths described in 1910